Robert Bont, was an English Member of Parliament.

He was a Member (MP) of the Parliament of England for Salisbury in 1360, 1361, 1363 and 1372.

References

14th-century births
Year of death missing
English MPs 1360
English MPs 1361
English MPs 1363
English MPs 1372